Guliana, also spelt Galiana and Gulyana, is a town  Union Council of Gujrat District in the Punjab Province of Pakistan.

Guliana is a very old village, now a town in the area. The village is mainly Gujjar dominant amounting to 70% of the population by caste Hashmi/Qureshi constitute the majority of the remaining 30%. It used to be a famous business route during pre-partition era (before 1947 AD) for surrounding villages and towns and for Kashmir.
It is located on roads from Kharian and Lalamusa towards Bhimber via Kolta Arab Ali Khan and to Manglia.

Notable people from this village include:- 
Suri Sehgal, an Indian-American scientist and philanthropist, was born in Guliana in 1934, Suri migrated to India aged 13 and then to the United States. Suri had a long career as a crop scientist, seedsman, entrepreneur and expert in the global hybrid seed industry. Another notable sufi is hafiz shamsuddin who wrote several books in persian which are still present in his mazaar   he has said to tell about the descendents of several prophets in this region

References

Populated places in Gujrat District